Anokhelal Mishra (1914..  10 March 1958)  also spelled as Anokhe Lal Misra and commonly known as Pandit Anokhelalji  was an Indian Tablā Artist who belonged to the Banaras Gharana of Hindustani classical music.

Early life

Anokhelal was born in a very poor family of Kashi (Banaras), now known as Varanasi (State – Uttar Pradesh).  Anokhelal learnt tabla under Bhairow Prasad Mishra (Bhairow is also spelled as Bhairav or Bhairon). Bhairow prasad Mishra detected his talent and enrolled him as a student of the Tabla in the Banaras Gharana of Ram Sahaiji at the age of 5 or 6 years. Anokhelal Learnt Tabla for about 15 years from Bhairow Prasad Mishra. Bhairow Prasad Mishra was disciple of Bhagat-ji. Bhagat-ji was disciple of Ram Sahai, the founder of The Banaras-Bāj (aka Banaras Gharana). According to The Banaras Bāj-The Tablā Tradition of a North Indian City by David Roach, Anokhelal was the most famous disciple of Bhairav Prasad Mishra among Maulvi Ram Mishra, Mahavir Bhatt, Mahadev Prasad Mishra, Anokhelal Mishra, and Nageshvar Prasad.

He lost his parents as teenager. After that he was brought up by his grandmother. As a child, Anokhelal had to suffer poverty and deprivation.

Musical journey

Anokhelal put in unremitting riyaaz (practice) under the guidance of Guruji (Master), which went on for hours together, every day.

Special abilities

He was called the Jadugar (wizard) of ' Na Dhin Dhin Na ' (theka of Teen Taal- 16beats) and ' Dhere Dhere Kite Taka ' (particular tabla syllables). He used to play these and many more syllables with clarity even at extreme speed. He was skilled at fast playing ' Na Dhin Dhin Na ' with his 1st finger.

Performances

Pandit Anokhelal was a soloist as well as an accompanist. Anokhelal performed a number of solo concerts during his career and also gave 'Sangat' (accompany) to many famous musicians and classical dancers. Some of them are Ustad Allauddin Khan, Ustad Vilayat Khan, Ustad Ali Akbar Khan, etc.

Within his short span of life he performed regularly, throughout India.
At a time, when performing in the 'National Programme of Music' on All India Radio was a matter of prestige, Pandit Anokhelal figured in the same, a number of times. In the late 1950s (after 1950), his programmes were broadcast by the Voice of America as well.

Legacy and critical acclaim

He is also known as the Samrat (king) of Tabla Playing.
All together he is known as Tabla Samrat Pandit Anokhelal Mishra.
According to many, Anokhelal goes the credit of making the audience familiar with the Banaras style of Tabla.

His Disciple Chandra Nath Shastri has written about Pandit Anokhelal Mishra in his web article:

"He was very simple livelihood. He knew only Sadhana (practice) of rendering Tabla."

Tabla Player Pandit Samta Prasad Mishra said in an interview that: 
" I am playing only one fourth of Pandit Anokhe Lal Mishra's style and they glorify my name. In the next life I will produce half of his sound quality, then they will really be floored!"

Tabla Player Sadanand Naimpalli written in his book about Anokhelal. He said:
"Apart from his skills as an accompanist, his Solo-recitals were also proof of his excellent Taiyaari and tonal sweetness."

Nature and personality

He used to maintain a sober and normal life profile rather than showing off and behaving like a celebrity. He never publicised himself of what he was.

Disciples

Anokhelal trained many musicians of India. Ramji Mishra, Mahapurush Misra, Ishwarlal Mishra (alias Lallu), Chhotelal Misra, Chandra Nath Shastri, Radhakanta Nandi, Kashinath Mishra (son), Bityut Banerjee, Partha Nath Shastri, Sanjay Mishra(Grandson),Sundar Lal Mishra and Chakkan Lal Mishra are some of the prominent pupils of Pt. Anokhelal Mishra.One of the notable disciple was Pt.Chhotelal Mishra.

Death

He was afflicted by Gangrene of his left foot in 1956 and for this disease he expired on 10 March 1958, at a young age of 44.

Inspiration

According to Sandip Bhattacharya (Disciple of Iswarlal Mishra):
"Pandit Anokhelal Mishra has been, and will continue to be, an inspiration to many tabla players from this generation, as well as future generations."

Discography
"Samrat" Rare Gems, Tal: Teental, Duration: 45.27mins, Accompanied in Harmonium by Jnanprakash Ghosh.
This recording dates back to 26 December 1957 at a concert attended by artists like Ahmed Jan Thirakwa, Habibuddin Khan, Maseet Khan, Karamatulla Khan etc.

A short video of Anokhelal Ji has been made available by the Huntley Film Archives .

See also
Ahmed Jan Thirakwa
Kishan Maharaj
Samta Prasad
Chandra Nath Shastri
Zakir Hussain
Alla Rakha

References

External links
Indian classical instrumental music in varanasi through the ages
Benares Gharana Characteristics, Wikipedia Article.
Varanasi: Art and Literature, Wikipedia Article.
Gopal Shankar Misra, Wikipedia Article.
Google Books results on Anokhelal Mishra
Google Scholar results on Anokhelal Mishra

Further reading

Tabla Samrat  Pandit Anokhelal Mishra | Official Website of Pandit Chandra Nath Shastri
Playing Techniques of Tabla, Banaras Gharana, by Pt. Chhote Lal Misra
The Banaras Bāj-The Tablā Tradition of a North Indian City, D Roach – Asian Music, 1972 – JSTOR.
Journal of the Indian Musicological Society: Volumes 11–12, Indian Musicological Society – 1980.
Page no. 100, Theory And Practice of Tabla, by Sadanand Naimpalli, Popular Prakashan, .
Asian music, Volumes 1–3, Society for Asian Music, JSTOR (Organization), Project Muse, 1968.
The Journal of the Music Academy, Madras: Volume 44, Music Academy (Madras, India) – 1974.
Companion to North Indian classical music: Satyendra Krishen Sen Chib, Munshiram Manoharlal Publishers, 2004.
India today international, Living Media International Ltd., 1 October 2005.
In Memoriam, Date- Friday, 2 June 2006, The Hindu.
 

Tabla players
1914 births
Hindustani instrumentalists
Indian drummers
Indian male musicians
World music percussionists
Indian percussionists
Performers of Hindu music
1958 deaths
Indian music educators
20th-century Indian musicians
20th-century drummers
Musicians from Varanasi
20th-century Indian male classical singers